The House at 1514 N. Michigan Street is a single family home located at 1514 N. Michigan Street in Saginaw, Michigan. It was listed on the National Register of Historic Places in 1982.

History
The house was later turned into a medical laboratory.

Description
The house at 1514 N. Michigan Street is a two-story wood frame Queen Anne house covered with clapboard. It has an octagonal tower and a round porch pavilion at one corner. Curved stairs frame the pavilion, which has a conical roof. The tower is topped by a curved hipped roof. The house exhibits other Queen Anne features such as bay windows, corbeled chimneys, porch and fascia spindlework, eave brackets, and an asymmetrically massing and roofline.

References

		
National Register of Historic Places in Saginaw County, Michigan
Queen Anne architecture in Michigan
Houses completed in 1880